Mitchell Wishnowsky (born 3 March 1992) is an Australian professional American football punter for the San Francisco 49ers of the National Football League (NFL). He was selected in the fourth round of the 2019 NFL Draft after a college career at Utah, where he won the Ray Guy Award and was a unanimous All-American as a sophomore in 2016. He was unanimously named to the College Football All-America Team as a result of his successful sophomore season.

Early life
Wishnowsky was born in Gosnells, a suburb of Perth, Western Australia, to New Zealand parents from Hawke's Bay. He was a student of Lumen Christi College from 2005 to 2009. He grew up playing Australian rules football, but was forced to give up the sport at age 18 due to repeated shoulder injuries. By that time, he had dropped out of secondary school at age 16 to become a glazier. While the work paid well enough for him to purchase a house in his hometown near Perth along with his best friend, he grew to hate the job and sought another career path. Although no longer playing full-contact Australian rules, he continued to play a flag version of the sport alongside several friends, one of whom had a connection to Prokick Australia, a training centre in Melbourne that converts Australian rules players into gridiron football punters. He left his job and moved across the country in 2013 to enrol in Prokick, spending a year there. By that time, Utah had brought in earlier Prokick graduate Tom Hackett, and were pleased enough with him that they reached an agreement with Prokick director Nathan Chapman to leave a scholarship open for Wishnowsky once Hackett's Utah career ended after the 2015 season. Since Wishnowsky needed time to secure NCAA eligibility, he enrolled in and punted for Santa Barbara City College in 2014, and redshirted in 2015, remaining in Santa Barbara to complete his associate degree and conserve NCAA eligibility.

College career
During his Ray Guy Award-winning season in 2016, he was second in Division I FBS in punting average (47.7 yards) and first in punts downed inside the opponent's 10-yard line (17). His 2017 season was only slightly less successful, with a 43.9-yard punting average and 10 punts downed inside the 10.

Collegiate statistics

Professional career

San Francisco 49ers
Wishnowsky was drafted in the fourth round (110th overall) of the 2019 NFL Draft. He was the first of two punters to be selected that year. Wishnowsky signed a four-year contract with the 49ers on 30 April 2019. In the ninth week, Wishnowsky landed five punts inside the 20-yard line with a long of 50 yards in a 28–25 win over the Arizona Cardinals, earning him NFC Special Teams Player of the Week. Wishnowsky reached Super Bowl LIV as a rookie. However, the 49ers lost 31–20 to the Kansas City Chiefs as Wishnowsky punted twice.

In the second week of the 2021 season, Wishnowsky averaged 45.2 yards per punt with three landing inside the 20 and one inside the five-yard line, earning NFC Special Teams Player of the Week. Due to an injury to Robbie Gould, Wishnowsky took over field goal and extra point kicking duties for a 3 October 2021 game versus the Seattle Seahawks.  Wishnowsky made one out of two extra points and missed a 41-yard field goal.  Wishnowsky is the first Australian to score a point in an NFL game.

On September 16, 2022, Wishnowsky signed a four-year, $13 million contract extension with the 49ers.

References

External links
 San Francisco 49ers bio
 Utah Utes bio
 Santa Barbara City Vaqueros bio
 West Australian Football League bio

1992 births
Living people
American football punters
Australian players of American football
Santa Barbara City Vaqueros football players
Sportspeople from Perth, Western Australia
Utah Utes football players
All-American college football players
San Francisco 49ers players
Australian rules football players that played in the NFL
Footballers who switched code